The Myanmar national football team represents Myanmar in men's international association football and are governed by the Myanmar Football Federation.

They were known as the Burma national football team until 1989, when Burma was renamed Myanmar. During their heyday, Burma finished second in the 1968 Asian Cup, participated in the Summer Olympics in 1972 and in the Asian Games and having won the Asian Games twice; in 1966 and 1970, and the football event of the Southeast Asian Games on five successive occasions; in 1965, 1967, 1969, 1971 and 1973. They didn't participate in any World Cup qualification for the rest of 20th century, contributing to the downfall of the national side.

Since renamed, Myanmar's highest achievement is the silver medal at 1993 Southeast Asian Games. Myanmar played its first World Cup qualifiers in 2007 in the 2010 World Cup qualifiers, losing 0–7 and 0–4 to China.

History

1948 to 1970s: the golden era 
Burma participated in 1954 Asian Games and won a bronze medal, standing behind Taiwan (gold) and South Korea (silver); this was the beginning of the golden era. On the other hand, the nation was not expected to contend for a medal in the Olympic-type Asian Games. In the meantime, this delegation became the first male Burmese team to win a continental medal. Against all odds, the Burma team bettered their 1954 effort by winning the gold medal in the Asian Games, which was held at Bangkok in the mid-1960s. In that tournament, Burma beat Iran in the gold-medal game.

The 1966 Asian Games gold medal-winning squad established itself as one of the two best teams in the region as it finished as runner-up to Iran at the 1968 Asian Cup. Having won a silver medal in 1968, the men's soccer team had a strong performance in the early 1970s as it qualified to compete in the 1972 Summer Olympics, which was held at Munich (West Germany), upon being one of the three finalists in the Asian tournament. Despite only winning against Sudan with 2–0, the Burmese players won the Fair Play Award. The following year, the nation earned its fifth consecutive Southeast Asian Games gold medal at Singapore City (Kuala Lumpur 1965, Bangkok 1967, Rangoon 1969, and Kuala Lumpur 1971).

Three years before that, the national team wrote perhaps their most important chapter: they captured the continental title for the second time in a row, after the Burmese Olympic Committee sent footballers to Thailand for the 1970 Asian Games. Burma thus became the second football squad to win the Asian tournament twice. They were declared national heroes in Rangoon, the then capital of Burma, with their second consecutive gold medal in men's soccer.

During this golden era, Burma produced many talented footballers. One among them is Suk Bahadur who is now considered as the greatest Burmese footballer of all time for his outstanding contribution to Burmese football.

Over the following years, mainly due to political problems within the country, the national side's ability to defend its Asian title slowly faded away.

1970s to 2010s: decline and struggle
In the later years, Burma were unable to achieve similar results like in the golden era, due to many factors. The collapse of whole Burmese football system during the rule of Ne Win and later, the junta, had a negative impact on Burmese football team. Lack of funding and poor infrastructure prevented many Burmese players to play abroad, thus leading to retirement. At the same time, the rise of Malaysia, Indonesia, Philippines and especially Vietnam and the Thailand made Myanmar's golden era fade away.

Despite this, Myanmar managed to win silver medal in 1993 Southeast Asian Games, after losing to Thailand in the final, or the 2004 Tiger Cup when Myanmar won bronze.

2010 to 2019 resurgence
Myanmar's 2011 reforms had been a major point of turning Myanmar's football, which had declined since 1970s. During this era, a new wave of Burmese football had arrived with the change of Myanmar's political climate, after many years under junta's rule.

The arrival of Gerd Zeise, a German manager, had been the crucial point. Under Gerd, Myanmar's football since reforms has witnessed a significant progress. The U-20 Myanmar team qualified to Myanmar's first ever FIFA tournament, the 2015 FIFA U-20 World Cup after going to the semi-finals in the 2014 AFC U-19 Championship as host. In 2016 AFF Suzuki Cup, Myanmar, as host, once again went to semi-finals, only losing to eventual champions, Thailand.

Between these successes, a lot of problems remain. Myanmar's football capability has been questioned after their disastrous 2018 World Cup qualification; while on the same time, a lot of teams in Asia have also risen up after many years under shadows. Once again, Myanmar failed to qualify for 2019 AFC Asian Cup, when they suffered a tremendous 1–5 defeat at the hand of Kyrgyzstan. Under Antoine Hey, Myanmar also had an unsuccessful 2018 AFF Championship, with the team was knocked out from the group stage, and Hey resigned after.

Myanmar began their 2022 FIFA World Cup qualification grouping with old rival Kyrgyzstan, as well as Tajikistan, Mongolia and especially powerhouse Japan. Under the guidance of the new manager Miodrag Radulović, Myanmar had a disastrous beginning when the team fell 0–1 to Mongolia away, 0–2 to Japan at home and especially a 0–7 away defeat to the Kyrgyz, causing the Montenegrin to be fired. After the defeat to Kyrgyzstan, old coach Antoine Hey returned, where he helped Myanmar to gain a shock home win 4–3 over Tajikistan before beating Mongolia 1–0 also at home to boost morale.

2020s: The dramatic fall

The COVID-19 pandemic in Myanmar and subsequent Myanmar protests depleted greatly the national team when many key players refused to represent Myanmar in international football citing the junta's involvement. As for the result, Myanmar brought to Japan with half of its squad members weren't regular starters, and suffered its worst defeat in modern era to the host 0–10, forcing Antoine Hey's men to win their 2 remaining matches against Tajikistan and Kyrgyzstan while hoping for defeats from their 2 main opponents in the same time against Japan (and even a draw or a defeat against Mongolia for Kyrgyzstan) to be among the 4 best runners-up. Having lost to Kyrgyzstan 1–8 the next match, Myanmar were officially eliminated from the World Cup and the top 2 spots in the group. Eventually, Myanmar confirmed its bottom place in the group, losing 0–4 to Tajikistan, and have to play the 2023 AFC Asian Cup qualification.

During the AFF Suzuki Cup, Singapore defeated Myanmar 3-0, with Ikhsan Fandi scoring a brace. Myanmar bounced back from that defeat with Than Paing and Maung Maung Lwin scored a goal each to give them hope of qualifying to the semi-finals. However, those hopes were made impossible after Thailand won 4-0 against Myanmar. Myanmar ended a disastrous tournament after failing to defeat the Philippines in the final matchday. The team were also drawn in the Group of Death in the 2023 AFC Asian Cup qualification, with World Cup Qualifying group members Kyrgyzstan and Tajikistan. The team are also to play against AFF Suzuki Cup group members Singapore.

The team failed to make any progress with German coach Antoine Hey in the Asian Cup qualifiers after being humiliated by Singapore, Tajikistan and Kyrgyzstan.

The AFF Mitsubishi Electric Cup took place with Myanmar having friendly matches in Thailand as preparation fixtures. They won two matches against club teams Chonburi and Samut Prakan. Despite this, they lost 6-0 to old rivals Thailand, although they fielded a weaker squad. The Asian Lions played their first match against Malaysia, but although counter-attacking play was good, they lost 1-0 due to Faisal Halim's goal and a late penalty from Win Naing Tun being saved. The team played Singapore, on artificial grass which cost them in addition to poor defending as the final result was 3-2 in Singapore's favour. However, Maung Maung Lwin did score two goals in this match: one being a composed right top corner finish while the other was a first-time volley. The team's chances of qualifying had been ruined, as they played Laos on home soil, going down 1-0 early on through Soukaphone Vongchiengkham but Kyaw Min Oo, who was having an excellent tournament scored a header, completely unmarked. Laos scored back through Ekkamai but in the dying minutes Maung Maung Lwin secured a point for the Asian Lions. However, this draw confirmed the team's elimination. They lost 3-0 against Vietnam in their final match and they failed to win in the AFF Championship for the first time since 2014. Despite poor results, the team can take positives away from this tournament as the playing style was praised by many fans.

Home stadium 

The national team plays most of its home matches in Thuwunna Stadium in Yangon, Myanmar. The stadium is larger and more up-to-date than Bogyoke Aung San Stadium. It was upgraded to a seating capacity of 50,000 spectators from capacity of 32000 in 2013.

Kits 
The Myanmar national team used to play with a kit made by FBT. This contract lasted until 2018.

In November 2018, the Myanmar national team signed a six-year contract with Warrix Sports. The sports kit sponsorship contract is valued at US$5.67 million and it will run from 1 November 2018 to 31 December 2024.

On 6 November 2018, Warrix introduced a new Myanmar home and away kit. Myanmar's home kit is a red shirt with red shorts and red socks while the away kit is a white shirt with white shorts and white socks.

Recent results and forthcoming fixtures 

The following is a list of match results in the last 12 months, as well as any future matches that have been scheduled.

2022

2023

Coaching staff

Coaching history

* As caretaker

Players

Current squad
The following players were called up for the March friendly matches.

Caps and goals updated as of 3 January 2023, after the match against Vietnam.

Recent call-ups
The following players have also been called up to the Myanmar squad within the last twelve months.

INJ Withdrew due to injury
PRE Preliminary squad
RET Retired from the national team
SUS Serving suspension
WD Player withdrew from the squad due to non-injury issue.

Player records

Players in bold are still active with Myanmar.

Most appearances

Top goalscorers

Competitive record

FIFA World Cup 

 Banned in 2006 for withdrawing from qualification in 2002.
 Initially banned from 2018 for crowd trouble during a 2014 World Cup qualifying match against Oman but later overturned to matches to be played on neutral soil.

Olympic Games

AFC Asian Cup

Asian Games

AFC Challenge Cup

AFF Championship

Southeast Asian Games

Head-to-head record

^ includes the results of 
^^ includes the results of

Honours

International
 Olympic Football Tournament
Fair Play Award: 1972

Continental
 AFC Asian Cup
  Runners-up (1): 1968
 Asian Games
  Gold medal (2): 1966, 1970*
  Bronze medal (1): 1954

Regional
 ASEAN Football Championship
Fourth place /Semifinalist(2) : 2004, 2016
 Southeast Asian Games
  Gold medal (5): 1965*, 1967, 1969, 1971, 1973
  Silver medal (3): 1961, 1993, 2007, 2015
  Bronze medal (2): 1975, 1977, 2011

Other awards
 Merdeka Tournament
  Winners (4): 1964, 1967*, 1971, 2006
  Runners-up (4): 1966, 1968, 1970, 2007
 Jakarta Anniversary Tournament
  Winners (4): 1971, 1973, 1974, 1975
  Runners-up (1) 1976
 Korea Cup (President's Cup)
  Winners (3): 1971*, 1972, 1973*
  Runners-up (1): 1975
  Third Place (1): 1974
 Myanmar Grand Royal Challenge Cup
  Winners (2): 2006, 2008
 Philippine Peace Cup
  Winners (1): 2014
Colombo Cup
  Third Place (3): 1952*, 1953, 1955
 4-nation Tiger Trophy
  Runners-up (1): 1995
AYA Bank Cup
  Third Place (1): 2016
*trophy shared

See also
 Myanmar national under-17 football team
 Myanmar women's national football team

References

External links

 

 
Asian national association football teams